Altınyayla (Kurdish:Tonus) is a town and a district of Sivas Province of Turkey. The mayor is Necmettin Mermer (AKP).

References

Populated places in Sivas Province
Districts of Sivas Province
Towns in Turkey